Elaine Morgan OBE, FRSL (7 November 1920 – 12 July 2013), was a Welsh writer for television and the author of several books on evolutionary anthropology. She advocated the aquatic ape hypothesis, which she advocated as a corrective to what she saw as theories that purveyed gendered stereotypes and so failed to take adequate account of women's role in human evolution. The Descent of Woman, published in 1972, became an international bestseller, translated into ten languages. In 2016, she was named as one of "the 50 greatest Welsh men and women of all time" in a press survey.

Personal life
Elaine Floyd was born and brought up in Hopkinstown, near Pontypridd, in Wales. Her father was a coal miner. She lived for many years until her death, in Mountain Ash, near Aberdare. She graduated from Lady Margaret Hall, Oxford, with a degree in English. She married Morien Morgan, a veteran of the Spanish Civil War who died in 1997, and they had three sons, the oldest being Dylan Morgan.

Writing
Elaine Morgan began writing in the 1950s after winning a competition in the New Statesman, successfully publishing, then joining the BBC when it began to produce her plays for television. Her works included popular dramas, newspaper columns, and a series of publications on evolutionary anthropology. Her first book, The Descent of Woman, published in 1972, became an international bestseller translated into ten languages. The book drew attention to what she saw as sexism inherent in the prevalent savannah-based "killer ape" theories of human evolution as presented in popular anthropological works by Robert Ardrey, Lionel Tiger and others. She argued that such "Tarzanist" anthropological narratives purveyed gendered stereotypes of women that failed to take adequate account of women's role in human evolution. The Aquatic Ape (1982), The Scars of Evolution (1990), The Descent of the Child (1994), The Aquatic Ape Hypothesis (1997) and The Naked Darwinist (2008) all explored her alternative account of human evolution in more detail.

She also published Falling Apart: the Rise and Decline of Urban Civilization in 1976, and in 2005 Pinker's List, a critique of Steven Pinker's The Blank Slate.

Morgan wrote for many television series, including the adaptations of How Green Was My Valley (1975), Off to Philadelphia in the Morning (1978) and Testament of Youth (1979). Her other work included episodes of Dr. Finlay's Casebook (1963–1970), the biographical drama The Life and Times of David Lloyd George (1981) and contributions to the Campion (1989) series.

She won two BAFTAs and two Writers' Guild awards. She also wrote the script for the Horizon documentary about the disabled fund-raiser Joey Deacon, winning the Prix Italia in 1975. She was honoured with the Writer of the Year Award from the Royal Television Society for her serialisation of Vera Brittain's Testament of Youth (1979).

In 2003 Morgan started a weekly column for the Welsh daily The Western Mail, which won her the 2011 award of Columnist of the Year in the Society of Editors' Regional Press Awards.

She was awarded an honorary D.Litt. by Glamorgan University in December 2006, an honorary fellowship of the University of Cardiff in 2007, and the Letten F. Saugstad Prize for her "contribution to scientific knowledge".

Morgan was appointed Officer of the Order of the British Empire (OBE) in the 2009 Birthday Honours for services to literature and education. She became a Fellow of the Royal Society of Literature the same year, and an honorary freeman of Rhondda Cynon Taf in April 2013.

Aquatic ape hypothesis

Morgan has promoted a version of the aquatic ape hypothesis, which proposes that human evolution had an "aquatic phase" in the Miocene or Pliocene epoch.

Although Morgan's aquatic ape hypothesis is still rejected by the anthropology and scientific community, it has achieved popular appeal since the publication of Descent of Woman in 1972.

Morgan's work has received warm comments from several prominent people. Philosopher Daniel Dennett wrote of the criticisms of her:

And in a BBC/Discovery Channel Documentary, the South African anthropologist Phillip V. Tobias said:

In 2000 Morgan was awarded the Letten F Saugstad prize in Oslo for her "contribution to scientific knowledge" and in December 2008 she was admitted as a Fellow of the Linnean Society, following in the footsteps of Charles Darwin and Alfred Russel Wallace.

Death and legacy
Morgan died at the age of 92 on 12 July 2013. Welsh author Trevor Fishlock described her in an obituary as a writer "who brought out the flavour of Wales."

In 2019, Morgan was one of five women on a shortlist for a Cardiff statue.

In 2020, to commemorate the centenary of her birth, two complementary biographies of her life were published. The Welsh historian Daryl Leeworthy wrote one focusing on her earlier career as a writer and Algis Kuliukas wrote one emphasising more her "aquatic ape" work.

On 18 March 2022 a statue of her by Emma Rodgers was installed outside the Tŷ Calon Lân Medical Centre in Mountain Ash, Rhondda Cynon Taf, as part of the Monumental Welsh Women project.

Works
Morgan's earlier works as a playwright include:
The Waiting Room: A Play for Women in One Act (Samuel French Ltd, 1958)
Rest You Merry: A Christmas Play in Two Acts (Samuel French Ltd, 1959)
Eli'r Teulu: Comedi Dair Act (Gwasg Aberystwyth, 1960)
The Soldier and the Woman: A Play in One Act (Samuel French Ltd, 1961)
Licence to Murder: A Play in Two Acts (Samuel French Ltd, 1963)
A Chance to Shine: A Play in One Act (Samuel French Ltd, 1964)
Love from Liz (Samuel French Ltd, 1967)

Morgan's books on human evolution include:
The Descent of Woman, 1972, Souvenir Press, 
The Aquatic Ape, 1982, Souvenir Press, 
The Scars of Evolution, 1990, Souvenir Press, 
The Descent of the Child: Human Evolution from a New Perspective, 1995, Oxford University Press, 
The Aquatic Ape Hypothesis, 1997, Souvenir Press, 
The Naked Darwinist, 2008, Eildon Press, 

Other works:
An essay "The Escape Route", also on Hardy Theory
Falling Apart: The Rise and Decline of Urban Civilisation, 1976, Souvenir Press Ltd 
Pinker's List, 2005, Eildon Press, 
Autobiography Knock 'Em Cold, Kid, 2012, Troubador Press,

References

Biographies

Entry on Elaine Neville Morgan in The Dictionary of Welsh Biography (National Museum of Wales)

1920 births
2013 deaths
20th-century Welsh dramatists and playwrights
20th-century Welsh writers
21st-century Welsh writers
20th-century Welsh women writers
21st-century Welsh women writers
Alumni of Lady Margaret Hall, Oxford
BAFTA winners (people)
Fellows of the Royal Society of Literature
Human evolution theorists
Officers of the Order of the British Empire
People from Mountain Ash, Wales
People from Pontypridd
Welsh feminists
Welsh science writers
Welsh television writers
British women television writers
Women science writers
BBC people
Welsh columnists
Welsh women columnists
Welsh women dramatists and playwrights